Pikeville is an unincorporated community in northern Jackson County, Alabama, United States. Pikeville is named for the fact that the community was located at the head of a turnpike.

Places to Go

This unincorporated community is home to the Pikeville Store.

References

Unincorporated communities in Alabama
Unincorporated communities in Jackson County, Alabama